Come Away with Me is the debut studio album by American recording artist Norah Jones, released on February 26, 2002, by Blue Note Records. Recording sessions took place at Sorcerer Sound Studio in New York City and Allaire Studios in Shokan, New York.

Come Away with Me peaked at number one on the US Billboard 200, and received Grammy Awards for Album of the Year and Best Pop Vocal Album.  It was later certified Diamond by the RIAA on February 15, 2005, for shipments of over ten million copies in the United States, and has sold over 27 million copies worldwide as of 2016, making it one of the best-selling albums of all time.

In April 2022, Blue Note released a 20th anniversary expanded edition of Come Away with Me, with demos from the First Sessions EP, previously unreleased demos, and outtakes.

Composition

Come Away with Me is an acoustic pop album that features Jones supported by jazz musicians: Kevin Breit, Bill Frisell, Adam Levy, Adam Rogers, and Tony Scherr on guitar; Sam Yahel on organ; Jenny Scheinman on violin; Rob Burger on accordion; and Brian Blade, Dan Rieser, and Kenny Wollesen on drums. Jones wrote the title song. Guitarist Jesse Harris wrote "Don't Know Why". The album includes Jones' versions of  "The Nearness of You" by Hoagy Carmichael and "Cold, Cold Heart" by Hank Williams.

Come Away with Me incorporates blues, jazz, folk, soul, and country. Bobby Dodd of All About Jazz writes that although the album features jazz standards, jazz purists and academics "may deny [Jones] jazz credibility for her folk infusion".

Commercial performance
Come Away with Me debuted at number 139 on the Billboard 200 in the US upon its release in February 2002 selling 10,000 copies in its first week. Despite being released at a time when music piracy was high and album sales were declining, the album was certified Platinum by the Recording Industry Association of America (RIAA) in August that same year. The album eventually climbed to the top of the Billboard 200 in January 2003, almost a year after it was released selling 108,000 copies that week. By the time of the Grammy Awards the following month, Come Away with Me had already sold 3 million copies in the country.  Jones' success at the award show resulted in the album moving another 600,000 copies the week immediately following the awards.  In total, the album appeared on the Billboard 200 for 165 weeks and sold 11.1 million copies in the US as of March 2016. The album was certified Diamond by the RIAA in February 2005 for selling over ten million copies in the US. It was also the eleventh best-selling album of the Nielsen SoundScan era as of 2016.

As of October 2016, the album had sold more than 27 million copies worldwide. Polyphonic HMI's "Hit Song Science" software claimed to have predicted the album's success months before its release, contradicting skeptical executives.  In Germany, the album debuted at No. 37. It remained on the German Albums Chart for 141 weeks and reached No. 2 in its 37th week on that chart, where it stayed for four weeks. Come Away with Me sold 750,000 copies, reaching 5× gold, becoming her most successful album in Germany and one of the longest charting albums on the German Albums Chart.

In celebration of the 20th anniversary of the album's release, Jones released a remastered version of the original album, as well as a collection of previously unreleased tracks and demos. The collection was released on April 29, 2022 in digital format, as well as in a set of three CDs and a set of 4 LP vinyl records. In anticipation of the album release, Jones released an alternate version of “Come Away With Me” on February 24, 2022.

Awards and honors
The album won Grammy Awards for Album of the Year, Best Pop Vocal Album, and Best Engineered Album, Non-Classical. The song "Don't Know Why" won Song of the Year, Record of the Year, and Best Female Pop Vocal Performance.

Rolling Stone ranked Come Away with Me at number 54 on its list of the 100 Best Albums of the Decade. Rhapsody ranked the album at 16 on its list of 100 Best Albums of the Decade, while Spinner listed the album at the 42nd Best Album of the 2000s.

Critical reception

Come Away with Me received acclaim from music critics. At Metacritic, which assigns a normalized rating out of 100 to reviews from mainstream critics, the album has an average score of 82 out of 100, which indicates "universal acclaim" based on 9 reviews.

The album received 3.5 out of 4 stars from both the Chicago Sun-Times and the Los Angeles Times reviews. AllMusic's David R. Adler wrote that "while the mood of this record stagnates after a few songs, it does give a strong indication of Jones' alluring talents." Robert Christgau of The Village Voice cited it as "the most unjazz album [Blue Note] has ever released" and criticized that "Jones's voice dominates the record."

The A.V. Club gave it a favorable review and called the album "A showcase for Jones' remarkable voice, the disc captures a singer whose rare instinct for interpretation always serves the song, rather than working against it." E! Online gave it an A and stated: "Gorgeous and intimate, the 14 songs on her debut disc ache with romantic maturity and a smart, slow-jam sexiness that belies the fact that, at 22, Jones is hardly older than Britney Spears." Kludge included it on their list of best albums of 2002.

20th anniversary edition 
In April 2022, a remastered expanded edition of Come Away with Me was released, with demos from the promo-only First Sessions EP, and including 22 previously unreleased demos, outtakes, and alternative versions.

Track listing

Personnel
 Norah Jones – vocals, piano (except tracks 2, 4, 8), Wurlitzer electric piano (track 4)
 Sam Yahel – Hammond B-3 organ (6, 7, 11)
 Rob Burger – pump organ (8), accordion (10)
 Jesse Harris – acoustic guitar (1, 5, 6, 9, 11–13), electric guitar (1)
 Adam Levy – electric guitar (3, 5, 6, 9, 11, 12), acoustic guitar (8, 10)
 Kevin Breit – acoustic guitar (2, 4), National guitar (2), electric guitar (4, 13)
 Adam Rogers – guitar (7)
 Tony Scherr – slide guitar and acoustic guitar (8)
 Bill Frisell – electric guitar (13)
 Jenny Scheinman – violin (9, 11)
 Lee Alexander – bass (exc. 14)
 Brian Blade – drums (2, 4, 6, 8–10, 12), percussion (2, 9)
 Dan Rieser – drums (1, 5, 7, 11)
 Kenny Wollesen – drums (13)

Technical personnel
 Producers: Arif Mardin, Norah Jones and Jay Newland (2, 4, 13, 2.4/17, original tracks of 1, 7), Craig Street (orig. tracks of 2, 4, 13, 2.1, 2.3/15)
 Engineers: Jay Newland, S. Husky Höskulds (orig. tracks of 2, 4, 13, 2.1, 2.3/15)
 Assistant engineers: Dick Kondas, Mark Birkey (1, 7), Brandon Mason (orig. tracks of 2, 4, 13)
 Mixing: Jay Newland, Arif Mardin (exc. 2, 4, 13)
 Mixing assistant: Todd Parker (2, 4, 13)
 Mastering: Ted Jensen

Charts

Weekly charts

Year-end charts

Decade-end charts

All-time charts

Certifications and sales

Awards
Grammy Awards

Brit Awards

Italian Music Awards

Japan Gold Disc Awards

See also
 List of best-selling albums
 List of best-selling albums by women
 List of best-selling albums in the United States
 List of best-selling albums in Australia
 List of best-selling albums in New Zealand
 List of best-selling albums in the United Kingdom

References

External links
 Come Away with Me at Discogs

2002 debut albums
Norah Jones albums
Albums produced by Arif Mardin
Albums produced by Craig Street
Blue Note Records albums
Grammy Award for Album of the Year
Albums arranged by Arif Mardin
Grammy Award for Best Pop Vocal Album
Grammy Award for Best Engineered Album, Non-Classical